Class 10 may refer to:

 Beneteau First Class 10, a French racing sailboat design
 British Rail Class 10, diesel locomotives
 DB Class 10, steam locomotives
 DB Class E 10, electric locomotives

 NSB El 10, electric locomotives
 SCORE Class 10, off-road racing buggies
 Secure Digital (SD) Cards  class of speed
 South Maitland Railways 10 Class, steam locomotives
 U-10-class submarine

See also
 X class (disambiguation)